= Dando the Illyrian =

Illyrian

Dando (or Dandon) was an Illyrian who, according to Pliny the Elder, supposedly lived for 500 years or more.
